Kochi University usually refers to Kōchi University in Kōchi, Kōchi Prefecture, Japan.

It may also refer to:
Kochi Gakuen College, a private junior college in Kōchi, Kōchi Prefecture, Japan
Kochi Women's University, a public university for women in Kōchi, Kōchi Prefecture, Japan
Kochi University of Technology, a private university in Kami, Kōchi Prefecture, Japan